Hussar was an American privateer active during the War of 1812. Hussar was launched in 1812 and made several cruises, first two as a letter of marque, and two as a privateer, but apparently without success.  captured her.

Letter of marque and privateer
First letter of marque: Captain Joshua Mezick commissioned Hussar on 10/31/12.
Second letter of marque: Captain Tom Manning commissioned her on 7/17/13.
First privateer cruise: Captain Joshua Mezick commissioned her on 11/3/13. No record of any captures. 
Second privateer cruise: Captain Francis Jenkins commissioned her on 5/17/14.

Capture
On 25 May 1814 Saturn captured Hussar at  after a four-hour chase. Hussar was armed with one 12-pounder gun and nine 12-pounder carronades, eight of which she threw overboard during the chase. Her complement consisted of 98 men. She had been in commission for only a week and had left New York the previous evening for her first cruise, bound for Newfoundland; she was provisioned for a four-month cruise. Nash described her as "coppered, copper-fastened, and sails remarkably fast".

Fate
Hussar was condemned at the Vice admiralty court, Halifax, Nova Scotia.

Notes

Citations

References

 
 
 

1812 ships
Privateer ships of the United States
Captured ships